The Russian Organization for Intellectual Property VOIS is the collective management society for neighboring rights of Russian performers and labels, established in 2008.

Today VOIS unites more than 3,500 performers and hundreds of record-labels in different music styles.

In 2009 Rosohrankultura (the Ministry of Culture Department) accredited VOIS as the sole society to collect and distribute remuneration for related rights owners within the territory of the Russian Federation. It means that only VOIS has the right to act on behalf of an unlimited number of performers and phonogram producers, collect and distribute money to the right-owners.

In everyday activity VOIS concludes contracts with music users both in public sphere and broadcasting.

The main goals of VOIS are:
 To collect the remuneration
 To distribute the remuneration between Russian and foreign right-holders (according with bilateral agreements with foreign collective societies)
 To represent Russian related rightholders abroad

Total amount of collected remuneration in 2012 reached about 531,7 mln. Rub.

See also
 Collective rights management
 Related rights
 Association of European Performers' Organisations

References

Music licensing organizations
Music organizations based in Russia
Organizations established in 2008